Juan José Alarcón García (born June 12, 1988) is a Venezuelan road cyclist, who rides for the Gran Misión Transporte Venezuela team.

Major results

2007
 1st Clasico Corre Por La Vida
 10th Overall Clásico Ciclístico Banfoandes
 10th Overall Vuelta a Guatemala
2008
 4th Overall Vuelta a Venezuela
2009
 1st Stage 3 Vuelta a Tovar
 2nd Overall Vuelta a Yacambu-Lara
1st Stage 2
 2nd Overall Clásico Virgen de la Consolación de Táriba
 4th Overall Vuelta a Venezuela
 8th Overall Vuelta al Táchira
1st Stage 8
2010
 National Under-23 Road Championships
2nd Road race
2nd Time trial
 2nd Overall Vuelta al Táchira
1st Stages 4, 9 & 12
 2nd Overall Vuelta a Cuba
1st Stage 8
 2nd Overall Vuelta a Venezuela
2011
 6th Overall Vuelta al Táchira
2013
 2nd Overall Clásico Aniversario de la Federación Venezolana de Ciclismo
 5th Overall Vuelta a Venezuela
 7th Overall Vuelta al Táchira
 Pan American Road Championships
8th Time trial
9th Road race
2014
 6th Overall Vuelta al Táchira
2015
 1st  Overall Vuelta a Venezuela
1st  Mountains classification
1st Stage 3
 4th Overall Vuelta a Guatemala
 10th Overall Vuelta al Táchira
2016
 2nd Time trial, National Road Championships
 3rd Overall Vuelta a Venezuela
1st Stage 7
2017
 2nd Time trial, National Road Championships
2018
 2nd Overall Vuelta a Venezuela
 3rd Time trial, National Road Championships
 8th Time trial, Central American and Caribbean Games
2021
 6th Overall Vuelta al Táchira
1st Stage 7 
 7th Overall Tour de Guadeloupe
1st Mountains classification
2022 
 1st Stage 7 Vuelta al Táchira
 2nd Time trial, National Road Championships
2023
1st   Overall Vuelta al Tachira en Bicicleta
1st   Mountains classification
1st Stages 5 & 7

References

External links

Venezuelan cyclists

1988 births
Living people
Venezuelan male cyclists
People from Mérida (state)
20th-century Venezuelan people
21st-century Venezuelan people